Yunost Stadium is a multi-purpose stadium in Slonim, Belarus. It is mostly used for football matches and is a home stadium for FC Slonim. The stadium holds 2,220 spectators.

History
In the past the stadium was a home venue for now-defunct club Kommunalnik Slonim, as well as for Beltransgaz Slonim (who became FC Slonim after absorbing Kommunalnik). 

Between 1999 and 2002 the stadium was closed for renovation works. During that period Kommunalnik hosted its matches at the smaller Dinamo Stadium (capacity 1,200), which is currently in decaying state and only used for amateur and youth matches.

References

External links
Stadium information 

Football venues in Belarus
Slonim
Multi-purpose stadiums in Belarus
Buildings and structures in Grodno Region